A profession is a specialized occupation.

Profession may also refer to:

Religious profession, in the Catholic Church, a commitment made by those entering a religious order
Profession (novella), a 1957 novella by Isaac Asimov
The Profession, a 2011 novel by Steven Pressfield